is a Japanese shōnen anime television series consisting of 46 episodes directed by Kazuyuki Okasako.  Loosely based on real life events of Tokugawa Mitsukuni, it is considered as a sort of remake of the successful jidaigeki drama Mito Kōmon filled with more fantastic elements.

Plot 
The shōgun Mito Mitsukuni crosses Japan in disguise, accompanied by two bodyguards, the master swordsman Suke (Sasashi Sukesumaburo) and the strongman Kaku-san (Atsumi Kakunoshin), the grandson Sutemaru, the dog Dombee and, in part of the series, by a girl named Yuki.

Each episode follows a basic plot: the group arrives in a village, with the shōgun hiding his identity. While they're resting they happen to witness some mysteries and some wrongdoings done by local personalities, prompting the group to investigate.

In the end of every episode Suke and Kaku confront the main evildoer and, after a brawl in which Suke and Kaku show their physical prowess besting the minions of the main perpetator with their abilities (Suke valiantly fighting with his katana, Kaku showing off "the strength of 100 men" to overcome his enemies), Suke shows the inrō that reveals Mitsukuni identity, ordering the villains to surrender and accept Mitsukuni's judgment, who then explains the mystery as an act of deliberate evil, punishes the wrongdoers and encourages the good people to go on with their lives.

Cast 
  Hirotaka Suzuoki as Sasaki Sukesumaburo (Suke-san)
 Masaru Ikeda as Atsumi Kakunoshin (Kaku-San) 
 Toshiya Sugita as Mito Kōmon (Tokugawa Mitsukuni) 
 Kazue Ikura as Okoto 
 Masako Miura as Onatsu 
 Naoki Tatsuta as Donbee 
 Yōko Matsuoka as Sutemaru

References

External links
 
 

1981 anime television series debuts
Adventure anime and manga
TV Tokyo original programming